The Calvert Institute for Policy Research is a think tank based in Baltimore, Maryland that espouses limited government ideas.

References

Think tanks based in the United States
Charities based in Maryland
Conservative organizations in the United States